Grayle is a surname. Notable people with the surname include:

Gardner Grayle, fictional character
John Grayle (1614–1654), English Puritan minister

See also
Gayle (surname)